

Buildings and structures

Buildings
 Dholavira, a metropolitan city of the Indus Valley civilization, located on Khadir island in the Kachchh District of Gujarat, India. The site was occupied from about 2900 to 2100 BC.

Reference

BC
Architecture